Paje is a village in Central District of Botswana. It is located 20 km north-east of Serowe, and the population was 2,088 in 2001 census.

References

Populated places in Central District (Botswana)
Villages in Botswana